The LG K series is a line of mid-range  smartphones which are designed, developed and marketed by LG Electronics, which run the Android mobile operating system.

The K Series, which launched in January 2016 with the K7 and K10, was followed by the K4, later that same month. The K8 debuted soon after in February that year, finishing out the 2016 lineup with the K3 in August. 

In December 2016, LG Electronics announced the updated phones for 2017 of K3, K4, K8, K10, alongside the K20 Plus, which then released a few days later, and a "V" models for Verizon Communications. Four months later, LG announced the updated K7, completing the 2017 lineup. 

Carriers include: ACG, AT&T, Boost Mobile, Cricket, LRA, Metro by T-Mobile, Republic Wireless, Spectrum, Sprint, T-Mobile, Unlocked, US Cellular, Verizon, Virgin Mobile, and Xfinity Mobile.

Phones

1st generation (2016 lineup) 

The first generation of the LG K series includes the first phones, LG K10, LG K7 and LG K4. They are launched in January 2016 and they are followed by LG K8, which was launched in February 2016, and later in March 2016, LG has launched the LG K5, and was followed by LG K3, which was launched in August 2016. The latest phone in 2016 of the LG K series was the LG K20 plus, which has a 16 or 32 GB of internal storage, 2 GB of RAM, Qualcomm Snapdragon 425 processor, and it is only available in Black color.

LG K10 
LG K10 was the first phone, launched in January 2016 as the K series phone, along with LG K7. It has a 5.3-inch screen, powered by a Qualcomm Snapdragon 410 chipset processor, 13-megapixels camera and a 2300 mAh battery.

LG K7 
LG K7 was the second phone, launched in January 2016 as the K series phone, along with LG K10. It comes with a 5-inch screen, 5-megapixels main and front cameras and a 2125 mAh battery.

LG K4 
LG K4 was the third phone, launched in January 2016 as the K series phone. It has a 4.5-inch screen, a sleek design and a 2-megapixels front camera. It launched along with LG K7 and LG K10 in the same month.

LG K8 
LG K8 is a successor to LG K7 and it is similar to the previous model. It was launched in February 2016, and has a different processor, an 8-megapixel rear camera and included autofocus.

LG K5 
LG K5 is a successor to LG K4 and it is similar to the previous model. It is launched in March 2016, and only it has a 5-inch screen, quad-core CPU and a 5-megapixel camera.

LG K3 
LG K3 is a predecessor to LG K4. It is launched in August 2016 and it is slightly weaker than the previous model, a VGA front camera and a downgraded CPU.

LG K20 plus 
LG K20 plus (aka. LG K20+, LG K20 (2016)), is a successor to LG K10 and released in December 2016. It has a 2700 mAh battery, upgraded processor and a higher storage and RAM.

Comparison

2017 lineup 
 LG K3 (2017)
 LG K4 (2017)
 LG K7 (2017)
 LG K8 (2017)
 LG K10 (2017)

2018 lineup 

 LG K8 (2018)
 LG K9
 LG K10 (2018)
 LG K11 (2018)
 LG K30

2019 lineup 

 LG K20 (2019)
 LG K30 (2019)
 LG K40
 LG K40S
 LG K50
 LG K50S

2020 lineup 

 LG K22
 LG K31
 LG K41
 LG K42
 LG K51
 LG K52
 LG K61
 LG K62
 LG K71
 LG K92 5G

See also 
 LG V series
 LG G series
 LG Q series

References 
https://www.lg.com/us/k-series-mobile-phone

K series
Android (operating system) devices